Weather Underground / HeavyWeather Uploader, commonly WUHU, is a free software package for Microsoft Windows which allows users with Personal Weather Stations to contribute weather data to one of several networks, including:
 Weather Underground (wunderground.com)
 Citizen Weather Observer Program (also known as CWOP)
 WeatherBug
 YoWindow
 Australian Weather Network
 UK Weather Net

It can collect data from multiple models of weather stations from La Crosse Technology, Davis Instruments, and Oregon Scientific.

References

External links 
 
 Yahoo! group

Crowdsourcing
Meteorological data and networks